Lincoln Memorial Cemetery is a commercial, privately owned, historically black cemetery located on the south side of Suitland Road (Maryland State highway 218) in Suitland, Maryland. The cemetery is adjacent to Washington National Cemetery and across the street from the historically white Cedar Hill Cemetery. The cemetery was established in 1927 and is the final resting place of many notable African-Americans, including Walter Washington, Charles Richard Drew, Charles Hamilton Houston, and Carter Godwin Woodson, the founder of black history month.

History 

Lincoln Memorial Cemetery was founded on part of the Landon dairy farm in 1927 by James Easley Edmunds of Lynchburg, VA for use by black residents of Washington metropolitan area during a time when cemeteries were segregated and there were few options in the District itself. In the 1920s and 1930s it was one of only two cemeteries for blacks in the area. The grounds were designed by landscape architect John H. Small.

The most prominent feature in the cemetery is the Bishop W. McCollough mausoleum, which features a statue of the seated Bishop created by Ed Dwight in 1991.

Notable interments 
 Len Bias (1963–1986), Maryland college basketball star
 Gail Cobb (1950–1974), first female police officer in the United States shot and killed in the line of duty
 Charles Richard Drew (1904–1950), medical pioneer in blood transfusions
 Edward "Len" Ford (1926–1972), Pro Football Hall of Fame inductee
 Sarah Loguen Fraser (1850–1933), fourth female African-American physician in the United States
 Ida Gibbs (1862–1957), one of the founders of Pan-Africanism
 Charlotte Wesley Holloman (1922–2015), opera singer
 Charles Hamilton Houston (1895–1950), Civil Rights lawyer, "The Man Who Killed Jim Crow""
 William Henry Hunt (1869–1951), diplomat
 Ernest Everett Just (1883–1941), scientist known for the recognition of the role of the cell surface in the development of organisms
 Sam Lacy (1903–2003), sports journalist
 John A. Lankford (1874–1946), architect, "the Dean of Black Architecture"
 Ulysses G. Lee (1913–1969), soldier, professor, author of The Employment of Negro Troops, coeditor of The Negro Caravan
 Harriet Gibbs Marshall (1868–1941), pianist, writer, and educator of music
 Van McCoy (1940–1979), Grammy-award winning R&B Singer known for "The Hustle"
 Kelly Miller (1863–1939), mathematician, sociologist, essayist, newspaper columnist and author. "The Bard of the Potomac"
 Max Robinson (1939–1988), the first African-American broadcast network news anchor in the United States
 Herbert Clay Scurlock (1875–1952), medical researcher
 Lucy Diggs Slowe (1885–1937), first Black woman to serve as Dean of Women at any American university. Founder of Alpha Kappa Alpha sorority
 Martha Cassell Thompson (1925–1968), architect
 Joseph A. Walker (1935–2003), Tony-award winning playwright and educator
 Walter Washington (1915–2003), first elected Mayor of the District of Columbia
 Charles H. Wesley (1891–1987), historian
 Carter G. Woodson (1875–1950), historian, "The Father of African American History"
 Smokey Joe Williams (1886–1951), baseball Hall of Fame honoree

References

Cemeteries in Maryland
Prince George's County, Maryland
African-American history of Prince George's County, Maryland
Burial grounds of the African diaspora in the Western hemisphere